700 (seven hundred) is the natural number following 699 and preceding 701.

It is the sum of four consecutive primes (167 + 173 + 179 + 181), the perimeter of a Pythagorean triangle (75 + 308 + 317) and a Harshad number.

Integers from 701 to 799
Nearly all of the palindromic integers between 700 and 800 (i.e. nearly all numbers in this range that have both the hundreds and units digit be 7) are used as model numbers for Boeing Commercial Airplanes, and the only one not officially used by Boeing, 797, is commonly speculated to be the number of the next new Boeing commercial airplane.

700s
 701 = prime number, sum of three consecutive primes (229 + 233 + 239), Chen prime, Eisenstein prime with no imaginary part
 702 = 2 × 33 × 13, pronic number, nontotient, Harshad number
 703 = 19 × 37, triangular number, hexagonal number, smallest number requiring 73 fifth powers for Waring representation, Kaprekar number, area code for Northern Virginia along with 571, a number commonly found in the formula for body mass index
 704 = 26 × 11, Harshad number, lazy caterer number , area code for the Charlotte, NC area.
 705 = 3 × 5 × 47, sphenic number, smallest Bruckman-Lucas pseudoprime 
 706 = 2 × 353, nontotient, Smith number
 707 = 7 × 101, sum of five consecutive primes (131 + 137 + 139 + 149 + 151), palindromic number, number of lattice paths from (0,0) to (5,5) with steps (0,1), (1,0) and, when on the diagonal, (1,1). Model number for the Boeing 707
 708 = 22 × 3 × 59, number of partitions of 28 that do not contain 1 as a part
 709 = prime number; happy number. It is the seventh in the series 2, 3, 5, 11, 31, 127, 709 where each number is the nth prime with n being the number proceeding it in the series, therefore, it is a prime index number.

710s
 710 = 2 × 5 × 71, sphenic number, nontotient, number of forests with 11 vertices 
 711 = 32 × 79, Harshad number, number of planar Berge perfect graphs on 7 nodes. Also the phone number of Telecommunications Relay Service, commonly used by the deaf and hard-of-hearing.
 712 = 23 × 89, refactorable number, sum of the first twenty-one primes, totient sum for first 48 integers. It is the largest known number such that it and its 8th power (66,045,000,696,445,844,586,496) have no common digits.
 713 = 23 × 31, blum integer, main area code for Houston, TX. In Judaism there is 713 letters on a Mezuzah scroll.
 714 = 2 × 3 × 7 × 17, sum of twelve consecutive primes (37 + 41 + 43 + 47 + 53 + 59 + 61 + 67 + 71 + 73 + 79 + 83), nontotient, balanced number, member of Ruth–Aaron pair (either definition); area code for Orange County, California.
 714 is the number of career home runs hit by Babe Ruth, a record that stood from his last home run on May 25, 1935, until being broken by Hank Aaron on April 8, 1974.
 Flight 714 to Sidney is a Tintin graphic novel.
 714 is the badge number of Sergeant Joe Friday.
 715 = 5 × 11 × 13, sphenic number, pentagonal number, pentatope number ( binomial coefficient   ), Harshad number, member of Ruth-Aaron pair (either definition)
 The product of 714 and 715 is the product of the first 7 prime numbers (2, 3, 5, 7, 11, 13, and 17)
 716 = 22 × 179, area code for Buffalo, NY
 717 = 3 × 239, palindromic number, model number for the Boeing 717
 718 = 2 × 359, area code for Brooklyn, NY and Bronx, NY
 719 = prime number, factorial prime (6! − 1), Sophie Germain prime, safe prime, sum of seven consecutive primes (89 + 97 + 101 + 103 + 107 + 109 + 113), Chen prime, Eisenstein prime with no imaginary part

720s

 720 (seven hundred [and] twenty)= 24 × 32 × 5.
 6 factorial, highly composite number, Harshad number in every base from binary to decimal, highly totient number.
 two round angles (= 2 × 360).
 five gross (= 500 duodecimal, 5 × 144).
 241-gonal number.
 721 = 7 × 103, sum of nine consecutive primes (61 + 67 + 71 + 73 + 79 + 83 + 89 + 97 + 101), centered hexagonal number, smallest number that is the difference of two positive cubes in two ways, 
 722 = 2 × 192, nontotient, number of odd parts in all partitions of 15, area of a square with diagonal 38
 G.722 is a freely available file format for audio file compression. The files are often named with the extension "722".
 723 = 3 × 241, side length of an almost-equilateral Heronian triangle
 724 = 22 × 181, sum of four consecutive primes (173 + 179 + 181 + 191), sum of six consecutive primes (107 + 109 + 113 + 127 + 131 + 137), nontotient, side length of an almost-equilateral Heronian triangle, the number of n-queens problem solutions for n = 10,
 725 = 52 × 29, side length of an almost-equilateral Heronian triangle
 726 = 2 × 3 × 112, pentagonal pyramidal number
 727 = prime number, palindromic prime, lucky prime, 
 model number for the Boeing 727
 728 = 23 × 7 × 13, nontotient, Smith number, cabtaxi number, 728!! - 1 is prime, number of cubes of edge length 1 required to make a hollow cube of edge length 12, 72864 + 1 is prime, number of connected graphs on 5 labelled vertices
 729 = 272 = 93 = 36.
 the square of 27, and the cube of 9, the sixth power of three, and as a consequence of these properties, a perfect totient number.
 centered octagonal number, Smith number
 the number of times a philosopher's pleasure is greater than a tyrant's pleasure according to Plato in the Republic
 the largest three digit cube. (9 x 9 x 9)
 the only three digit sixth power. (3 x 3 x 3 x 3 x 3 x 3)

730s
 730 = 2 × 5 × 73, sphenic number, nontotient, Harshad number, number of generalized weak orders on 5 points 
 731 = 17 × 43, sum of three consecutive primes (239 + 241 + 251), number of Euler trees with total weight 7 
 732 = 22 × 3 × 61, sum of eight consecutive primes (73 + 79 + 83 + 89 + 97 + 101 + 103 + 107), sum of ten consecutive primes (53 + 59 + 61 + 67 + 71 + 73 + 79 + 83 + 89 + 97), Harshad number, number of collections of subsets of {1, 2, 3, 4} that are closed under union and intersection 
 733 = prime number, emirp, balanced prime, permutable prime, sum of five consecutive primes (137 + 139 + 149 + 151 + 157)
 734 = 2 × 367, nontotient, number of traceable graphs on 7 nodes 
 735 = 3 × 5 × 72, Harshad number, Zuckerman number, smallest number such that uses same digits as its distinct prime factors
 736 = 25 × 23, centered heptagonal number, happy number, nice Friedman number since 736 = 7 + 36, Harshad number
 737 = 11 × 67, palindromic number, blum integer, model number of the Boeing 737 jet airliner.
 738 = 2 × 32 × 41, Harshad number, designation for a Boeing 737-800 jet airliner.
 739 = prime number, strictly non-palindromic number, lucky prime, happy number, prime index prime

740s
 740 = 22 × 5 × 37, nontotient, number of connected squarefree graphs on 9 nodes 
 741 = 3 × 13 × 19, sphenic number, triangular number
 742 = 2 × 7 × 53, sphenic number, decagonal number, icosahedral number. It is the smallest number that is one more than triple its reverse. Lazy caterer number . Number of partitions of 30 into divisors of 30.

 743 = prime number, Sophie Germain prime, Chen prime, Eisenstein prime with no imaginary part
 744 = 23 × 3 × 31, sum of four consecutive primes (179 + 181 + 191 + 193). It is the coefficient of the first degree term of the expansion of Klein's j-invariant. Furthermore, 744 =3 × 248 where 248 is the dimension of the Lie algebra E8.
 745 = 5 × 149 = 24 + 36, number of non-connected simple labeled graphs covering 6 vertices
 746 = 2 × 373 = 15 + 24 + 36 = 17 + 24 + 36, nontotient, number of non-normal semi-magic squares with sum of entries equal to 6
 747 = 32 × 83 = , palindromic number, model number of the Boeing 747 jet airliner

 748 = 22 × 11 × 17, nontotient, happy number, primitive abundant number
 749 = 7 × 107, sum of three consecutive primes (241 + 251 + 257), blum integer

750s
 750 = 2 × 3 × 53, enneagonal number.
 751 = prime number, Chen prime, emirp
 752 = 24 × 47, nontotient, number of partitions of 11 into parts of 2 kinds
 753 = 3 × 251, blum integer
 754 = 2 × 13 × 29, sphenic number, nontotient, totient sum for first 49 integers, number of different ways to divide a 10 × 10 square into sub-squares 
 755 = 5 × 151, number of vertices in a regular drawing of the complete bipartite graph Kn,n. In 1976, Major League Baseball player Hank Aaron ended his career with a Major League record 755 home runs (record now held by Barry Bonds).
 756 = 22 × 33 × 7, sum of six consecutive primes (109 + 113 + 127 + 131 + 137 + 139), pronic number, Harshad number
 757 = prime number, palindromic prime, sum of seven consecutive primes (97 + 101 + 103 + 107 + 109 + 113 + 127), happy number, model number for the Boeing 757
 "The 757" is a local nickname for the Hampton Roads area in the U.S. state of Virginia, derived from the telephone area code that covers almost all of the metropolitan area
 758 = 2 × 379, nontotient, prime number of measurement 
 759 = 3 × 11 × 23, sphenic number, sum of five consecutive primes (139 + 149 + 151 + 157 + 163), a q-Fibonacci numbers for q=3

760s
 760 = 23 × 5 × 19, centered triangular number, number of fixed heptominoes.
 761 = prime number, emirp, Sophie Germain prime, Chen prime, Eisenstein prime with no imaginary part, centered square number
 762 = 2 × 3 × 127, sphenic number, sum of four consecutive primes (181 + 191 + 193 + 197), nontotient, Smith number, admirable number, number of 1's in all partitions of 25 into odd parts, see also Six nines in pi
 763 = 7 × 109, sum of nine consecutive primes (67 + 71 + 73 + 79 + 83 + 89 + 97 + 101 + 103), number of degree-8 permutations of order exactly 2 
 764 = 22 × 191, telephone number
 765 = 32 × 5 × 17, octagonal pyramidal number 
 a Japanese word-play for Namco; 
 766 = 2 × 383, centered pentagonal number, nontotient, sum of twelve consecutive primes (41 + 43 + 47 + 53 + 59 + 61 + 67 + 71 + 73 + 79 + 83 + 89)
 767 = 13 × 59, Thabit number (28 × 3  − 1), palindromic number, model number for the Boeing 767
 768 = 28 × 3, sum of eight consecutive primes (79 + 83 + 89 + 97 + 101 + 103 + 107 + 109)
 769 = prime number, Chen prime, lucky prime, Proth prime

770s
 770 = 2 × 5 × 7 × 11, nontotient, Harshad number
  is prime
  Famous room party in New Orleans hotel room 770, giving the name to a well known science fiction fanzine called File 770
 Holds special importance in the Chabad-Lubavitch Hasidic movement.
 771 = 3 × 257, sum of three consecutive primes in arithmetic progression (251 + 257 + 263). Since 771 is the product of the distinct Fermat primes 3 and 257, a regular polygon with 771 sides can be constructed using compass and straightedge, and  can be written in terms of square roots.
 772 = 22 × 193, 772!!!!!!+1 is prime
 773 = prime number, Eisenstein prime with no imaginary part, tetranacci number, prime index prime
 774 = 2 × 32 × 43, nontotient, totient sum for first 50 integers, Harshad number
 775 = 52 × 31, member of the Mian–Chowla sequence, happy number
 776 = 23 × 97, refactorable number, number of compositions of 6 whose parts equal to q can be of q2 kinds

 777 = 3 × 7 × 37, sphenic number, Harshad number, palindromic number, model number of the Boeing 777 jet airliner, 3333 in senary (base 6) counting.
 The numbers 3 and 7 are considered both "perfect numbers" under Hebrew tradition.
 778 = 2 × 389, nontotient, Smith number
 779 = 19 × 41, highly cototient number

780s
 780 = 22 × 3 × 5 × 13, sum of four consecutive primes in a quadruplet (191, 193, 197, and 199); sum of ten consecutive primes (59 + 61 + 67 + 71 + 73 + 79 + 83 + 89 + 97 + 101), triangular number, hexagonal number, Harshad number
 780 and 990 are the fourth smallest pair of triangular numbers whose sum and difference (1770 and 210) are also triangular.
 781 = 11 × 71, sum of powers of 5/repdigit in base 5 (11111), Mertens function(781) = 0, lazy caterer number 
 782 = 2 × 17 × 23, sphenic number, nontotient, pentagonal number, Harshad number, also, 782 gear used by U.S. Marines
 783 = 33 × 29, heptagonal number
 784 = 24 × 72 = 282 = , the sum of the cubes of the first seven positive integers, happy number
 785 = 5 × 157, Mertens function(785) = 0, number of series-reduced planted trees with 6 leaves of 2 colors 

 786  = 2 × 3 × 131, sphenic number, admirable number. See also its use in Muslim numerological symbolism.
 787 = prime number, sum of five consecutive primes (149 + 151 + 157 + 163 + 167), Chen prime, lucky prime, palindromic prime, model number for the Boeing 787 Dreamliner
 788 = 22 × 197, nontotient, number of compositions of 12 into parts with distinct multiplicities 
 789 = 3 × 263, sum of three consecutive primes (257 + 263 + 269), blum integer

790s

 790 = 2 × 5 × 79, sphenic number, nontotient
 791 = 7 × 113, centered tetrahedral number, sum of the first twenty-two primes, sum of seven consecutive primes (101 + 103 + 107 + 109 + 113 + 127 + 131)
 792 = 23 × 32 × 11, number of partitions of 21, binomial coefficient , Harshad number, sum of the nontriangular numbers between successive triangular numbers
 793 = 13 × 61, Mertens function(793) = 0, star number, happy number
 794 = 2 × 397 = 16 + 26 + 36, nontotient
 795 = 3 × 5 × 53, sphenic number, Mertens function(795) = 0, number of permutations of length 7 with 2 consecutive ascending pairs 
 796 = 22 × 199, sum of six consecutive primes (113 + 127 + 131 + 137 + 139 + 149), Mertens function(796) = 0
 797 = prime number, Chen prime, Eisenstein prime with no imaginary part, palindromic prime, two-sided prime, prime index prime, speculated model number for the Boeing New Midsize Airplane
 798 = 2 × 3 × 7 × 19, Mertens function(798) = 0, nontotient, product of primes indexed by the prime exponents of 10! 
 799 = 17 × 47, smallest number with digit sum 25

References

Integers